Federation of Trade Unions can refer to:

 All-China Federation of Trade Unions
 Federation of Independent Trade Unions of Russia
 Federation of Trade Unions of Belarus
 Federation of Trade Unions of Burma
 Federation of Trade Unions of Macedonia
 Federation of Trade Unions of the Republic of Kazakhstan
 Federation of Trade Unions of Ukraine
 Federation of Trade Unions of Uzbekistan
 General Federation of Trade Unions (Syria)
 the Hong Kong Federation of Trade Unions
 International Federation of Trade Unions
 Kyrgyzstan Federation of Trade Unions
 World Federation of Trade Unions

See also 

 List of federations of trade unions
 Confederation of Trade Unions (disambiguation)